INS Sharada (P55) is a Sukanya class patrol vessel of the Indian Navy.

Operations 
On 17 May 2017, the ship rescued a Liberian registered merchant vessel, MV Mountbatten, from pirates while on patrol in the gulf of Aden.

References

Sukanya-class patrol vessels
Patrol vessels of the Indian Navy
Naval ships of India
1990 ships